Caucasian Tatar is a historical ethnonym for Turkic-speaking Muslims living in the Caucasus region, used up to the early 20th century, and may refer to:
 Modern Azerbaijani people and other Muslim groups living in Transcaucasia (South Caucasian Tatars), called Caucasian Tatars in Soviet Census until 1939
 Kumyks of Dagestan (North Caucasian Tatars or Dagestan Tatars)